Jacobothrips is a genus of thrips in the family Phlaeothripidae.

Species
 Jacobothrips carolinae

References

Phlaeothripidae
Thrips genera